Rendering APIs typically provide just enough functionality to abstract a graphics accelerator, focussing on rendering primitives, state management, command lists/command buffers;  and as such differ from fully fledged 3D graphics libraries, 3D engines (which handle scene graphs, lights, animation, materials etc.), and GUI frameworks; Some provide fallback software rasterisers, which were important for compatibility and adoption before graphics accelerators became widespread.

Some have been extended to include support for compute shaders.

Low level rendering APIs typically leave more responsibility with the user for resource memory management, and require more verbose control, but have significantly lower CPU overhead, and allow greater utilisation of multicore processors.

2D rendering APIs

 OpenVG
 Direct2D
 Quartz 2D
 Anti-Grain Geometry (AGG)
 Simple DirectMedia Layer (SDL)
 Simple and Fast Multimedia Library (SFML)
 X11
 Cairo
 Skia
 Qt GUI primitive rendering abstractions, on which Qt widgets are built
 Blend2D
 HTML5 Canvas element

Offline rendering 

 RenderMan aimed at offline rendering for CG films.

Software rasterising 

As of 2016, these are generally considered obsolete, but were still important during the transition to hardware acceleration:

 BRender by argonaut software

3D rendering APIs 

These libraries are designed explicitly to abstract 3D graphics hardware for CAD and video games, with possible software fallbacks.

Cross platform, high level 
 OpenGL and the OpenGL Shading Language
 OpenGL ES 3D API for embedded devices
 OpenGL SC a version of openGL for safety critical systems.
 RenderWare (combined game engine and cross platform rendering API. Became popular since the PlayStation 2 had no rendering API, initially relying on bare metal programming.)

Cross platform, low level 
 Vulkan

Vendor specific, high level 

 Direct3D (a subset of DirectX)
 Glide API for the pioneering 3DFX accelerators
 QuickDraw 3D developed by Apple Computer starting in 1995, abandoned in 1998
 PSGL for the PlayStation 3, designed to work in a manner similar to openGL

Vendor specific, low level 
 Direct3D 12 (a subset of DirectX)
 Metal developed by Apple.
 Mantle developed by AMD.
 LibGCM for the PlayStation 3, a lower level API managing command lists directly
 LibGXM for the PlayStation Vita
 LibGNM for the PlayStation 4
 Redline , for the obsolete Rendition Verite accelerator
 Kamui for the Dreamcast

Application programming interfaces